This is the results breakdown of the local elections held in Catalonia on 8 May 1983. The following tables show detailed results in the autonomous community's most populous municipalities, sorted alphabetically.

Overall

City control
The following table lists party control in the most populous municipalities, including provincial capitals (shown in bold). Gains for a party are displayed with the cell's background shaded in that party's colour.

Municipalities

Badalona
Population: 231,175

Barcelona

Population: 1,771,998

Cornellá
Population: 91,313

Gerona
Population: 65,586

Hospitalet
Population: 291,066

Lérida
Population: 109,397

Mataró
Population: 98,589

Reus
Population: 81,182

Sabadell
Population: 189,147

Sant Cugat del Vallès
Population: 32,076

Santa Coloma de Gramanet
Population: 139,859

Tarragona
Population: 112,238

Tarrasa
Population: 164,218

References

Catalonia
1983